Master of Fogdö (Danish: Unionsmästaren) is the name given to an anonymous artist active in Sweden and Denmark in the first half of the 15th century when he and his workshop decorated churches with frescoes of high artistic quality. His work can be seen in Fogdö Church (hence the name), Runtuna Church and Strängnäs Cathedral, all in Södermanland.

It has been suggested that the Master of Fogdö may also be responsible for the frescoes in the Danish churches of  Undløse and Nødebo near Holbæk. The artist behind these is known as the Union Master but while there are similarities, especially in the figures, there are also differences making identification uncertain and calling for further research. The Master's style is thought to be closely related to that of the  Schöne Stil.

See also 
 Union Master

References

Further reading

  
  

Medieval Swedish painters
Fresco painting
Anonymous artists
15th-century artists
15th-century Swedish people

sv:Unionsmästaren